Barnham railway station is in Barnham, West Sussex, England around  north of Bognor Regis.

It is located on the West Coastway Line between Brighton and Southampton,  down the line from  via . The station and all services are operated by Southern which operate at the station using Classes 313 and 377s EMUs

Platforms
Barnham is the junction station for the short branch to Bognor Regis. It is also a well-used interchange for passengers between slow and fast services. It has eastbound services to London Victoria via Horsham and Gatwick Airport, Brighton via Worthing and Littlehampton via Ford, as well as westbound services to Bognor Regis, Portsmouth, Southampton. Trains travelling from east to west (i.e. heading towards Chichester and Bognor Regis) sometimes divide at Barnham, particularly services on sundays.

Platform 1 - Bognor Regis from Barnham & Littlehampton, London Victoria via Horsham (Sundays)
Platform 2 - Westbound services towards Chichester, Portsmouth and Southampton, Bognor Regis from London
Platform 3 - Eastbound services towards Littlehampton, Brighton, London

Services
All services at Barnham are operated by Southern using  and  EMUs.

The typical off-peak service in trains per hour is:
 4 tph to  via  (2 of these run non-stop to Horsham and 2 are stopping services - the fast and stopping services attach at Horsham, giving 2 tph to London Victoria beyond Horsham)
 2 tph to  via 
 2 tph to 
 4 tph to 
 2 tph to 

Former services
Until May 2022, Great Western Railway operated limited services between Brighton, Portsmouth Harbour and Bristol Temple Meads that called at Barnham.

Accidents and incidents
On 1 August 1962, an electric multiple unit was derailed when points switched under it due to an electrical fault. Thirty-eight people were injured. The cause was an electrical short circuit due to a metal washer that had been left behind after maintenance, which caused a false feed to the points motor under unusual circumstances with a very high power load from three trains accelerating simultaneously. Adrian Vaughan commented; "One gets a nasty feeling wondering where the next washer is, at this moment, lying in wait with the potential of mayhem". Before his book had even been published, the Clapham Junction disaster occurred, with a very similar cause.

References

External links

Arun District
Former London, Brighton and South Coast Railway stations
DfT Category D stations
Railway stations in Great Britain opened in 1864
Railway stations in West Sussex
Railway stations served by Govia Thameslink Railway